P. concinna may refer to:

 Paracorixa concinna, a water boatman
 Parodia concinna, a flowering plant
 Perrinia concinna, a sea snail
 Petrogale concinna, an Australian macropod
 Phalaena concinna, a North American moth
 Phasianella concinna, a pheasant shell
 Philbertia concinna, a sea snail
 Phippsia concinna, an ice grass
 Physalacria concinna, a tropical fungus
 Pittoconcha concinna, a land snail
 Platycleis concinna, a shield-backed katydid
 Pleurothallis concinna, a bonnet orchid
 Polythore concinna, a New World damselfly
 Potentilla concinna, a flowering plant
 Prothyma concinna, a ground beetle
 Pseudemys concinna, a freshwater turtle
 Pteris concinna, a polypod fern
 Pterostylis concinna, a terrestrial orchid